William C. Putnam State Forest covers   in Grafton in Windham County, Vermont. The forest is managed by the Vermont Department of Forests, Parks, and Recreation.

Activities in the forest include hiking, snowshoeing and hunting.

References

External links
Official website

Vermont state forests
Protected areas of Windham County, Vermont
Grafton, Vermont